is a Japanese anime director employed by Madhouse. He made his full directorial debut in 2011 with No. 6. Starting in 2016, he directed the anime adaptation of My Hero Academia, which has received praise from critics.

Biography
Kenji Nagasaki decided to join the anime industry in high school after watching Hayao Miyazaki's Castle in the Sky. He debuted as a series director with the anime adaptation of No. 6. In 2013, he directed Gundam Build Fighters, based on the Gundam franchise. In 2015, he directed the anime original series Classroom Crisis.

Starting in 2016, Nagasaki directed the anime adaptation of My Hero Academia. He also directed the three anime films based on the series. The series has received praise, with Paste ranking the adaptation among the top 40 anime of all time. Polygon, Crunchyroll, and IGN also named the adaptation as one of the best anime of the 2010s. At the Crunchyroll Anime Awards, the adaptation was nominated for anime of the year in 2016 and the film My Hero Academia: Two Heroes won the award for best film in 2018. He also won best international director at Lusca Fantastic Film Fest in 2018.

Works

Television series
 Monster (2004–2005) (episode director)
  (2005) (episode 4 director)
  (2010–2011) (episode storyboards)
 No. 6 (2011) (director)
  (2013–2014) (director)
 Classroom Crisis (2015) (director)
  (2016–present) (director)

Films
  (2018) (director)
  (2019) (director)
  (2021) (director)

Video games
  (2013) (cutscene director)

References

External links
 

Anime directors
Madhouse (company) people
Japanese film directors
Japanese storyboard artists
Japanese television directors
Living people
Year of birth missing (living people)